Samuel Grandsir (born 14 August 1996) is a French professional footballer who plays as a winger for Ligue 2 club Le Havre.

Youth career
Grandsir started his youth career in his hometown, Évreux. He eventually moved to the youth team of Troyes.

Club career
After spending time with the youth team and reserve team, Grandsir signed with the Troyes senior team in 2016.

Garnering attention from other clubs after several impressive seasons, he moved to Monaco for €5.250m in 2018. Grandsir went on loan from Monaco to Strasbourg in January 2019 followed by another loan to Brest for the 2019–20 season.

On 11 March 2021, Grandsir signed with Major League Soccer club LA Galaxy. On 23 January 2023, Grandsir returned to his native France to join Ligue 2 leaders Le Havre on a contract until the end of the season.

International career
Born in France, Grandsir is of Senegalese descent. He represented France at the youth international level.

Career statistics

Honours
Strasbourg
Coupe de la Ligue: 2018–19

References

External links

1996 births
Living people
Sportspeople from Évreux
Footballers from Normandy
French footballers
Association football wingers
ES Troyes AC players
AS Monaco FC players
RC Strasbourg Alsace players
Stade Brestois 29 players
LA Galaxy players
Le Havre AC players
Ligue 1 players
Ligue 2 players
Major League Soccer players
France youth international footballers
France under-21 international footballers
French expatriate footballers
Expatriate footballers in Monaco
French expatriate sportspeople in Monaco
Expatriate soccer players in the United States
French expatriate sportspeople in the United States
French sportspeople of Senegalese descent